Ocean Man 69U is an Indian reserve of the Ocean Man First Nation in Saskatchewan.

References

Indian reserves in Saskatchewan
Ocean Man First Nation